The European Union Monitoring Mission (EUMM), until 2000 known as the European Community Monitoring Mission (ECMM), was a mission of the European Union in the former Yugoslavia.

History
The European Union Monitoring Mission began operating in July 1991 under the name of ECMM (European Community Monitoring Mission). The mission was financed by the European Commission and consisted of 75 field specialists. The mission was headquartered in Zagreb and its designated area included Bosnia and Herzegovina, Croatia, Serbia, Montenegro, Albania and the Republic of Macedonia. ECMM was renamed as European Union Monitoring Mission on 22 December 2000.

In January 1992, the mission was briefly suspended following the helicopter downing that killed five of its observers.

The EUMM in the former Yugoslavia ended on 31 December 2007.

See also
List of military and civilian missions of the European Union
European Union Monitoring Mission in Georgia
European Union Monitoring Capacity to Armenia
European Union Monitoring Mission Medal
European Community Monitor Mission Medal

References

Bosnian War
Monitoring missions of the European Union